Lavandevil District is a district (bakhsh) in Astara County, Gilan Province, Iran. At the 2006 census, its population was 20,721, in 4,891 families.  The District has one city: Lavandevil. The District has two rural districts (dehestan): Chelevand Rural District and Lavandevil Rural District.

References 

Astara County
Districts of Gilan Province